"Outside the Wall" (working titles "Bleeding Hearts", "The Buskers") is a song written by Roger Waters. It appeared on the 1979 Pink Floyd album, The Wall.

Overview
This song is meant as a dénouement to the album. The story ends with "The Trial", in which a "judge" decrees, "Tear down the wall!". An explosion is heard to signify the wall's destruction, and "Outside the Wall" quietly begins. It is not explicitly stated what happens to Pink, the protagonist, after the dismantling of his psychological "wall". At the end, the song cuts off abruptly, as the man says "Isn't this where...", leading into the voice clip at the beginning of "In the Flesh?" that states "...we came in?", giving a sort of circularity to the album.

Composition
The song is the quietest on the album. It is a diatonic song in C Major, in 3/4 and is 1:41 in length. In the original demo version of this song, a harmonica was used in place of the clarinet heard on the album version.

Plot
Unlike the other songs on the album, this particular song offers little to the plot involving Pink as a whole. It notes that "the ones who really love you" are standing outside the wall and warns that, if you do not tear down your metaphorical wall, some might eventually give up on you and leave you to live out a lonely life instead of "banging [their] heart against some mad bugger's wall". This is what happens to the main character, Pink, during the course of the album.

Roger Waters himself has refused to provide any explanation when asked for one.

Film version
A longer and more elaborate version was recorded for the film which runs for a little more than four minutes and includes the National Philharmonic Orchestra, the Pontarddulais Male Choir and Waters singing the lyrics melodically, rather than reciting them as on the album version. Helping extend the song through the entire end credits is an instrumental bridge, composed of the chords and melody from "Southampton Dock", from The Wall'''s eventual successor, The Final Cut. This version was never released officially, but was later reused for the credits for The Wall – Live in Berlin. It is in E-flat major for the film rather than C, and the Live in Berlin version is done in E Major, while "Southampton Dock" would be finalized in F major.Pink Floyd: The Final Cut (1983 Pink Floyd Music Publishers Ltd., London, England.)

Stage performance
The stage performances of The Wall ended with "Outside the Wall" after "The Trial", where the performers came walking over the stage in front of the now demolished wall, playing acoustic instruments and singing the vocal tracks. Waters played clarinet, and recited the lyrics, while the backing singers sang the lyrics in harmony. David Gilmour played mandolin, Richard Wright played accordion, Willie Wilson played tambourine, Andy Bown played 12-string acoustic guitar, and Snowy White (replaced by Andy Roberts for the 1981 shows), Peter Wood and (unusually) Nick Mason played 6-string acoustic guitars. A similar format was used for the track during Waters' 2010-2013 tour, The Wall Live, including the appearance of Gilmour playing the mandolin and Mason playing a tambourine. The song was performed again as the closing number for Waters' This Is Not a Drill.

Personnel
Pink Floyd
Roger Waters – Vocals

with:

Frank Marocco – Concertina
Larry Williams – Clarinet
Trevor Veitch – Mandolin
Children's choir from New York – backing vocals

Pink Floyd - Live version, 1980 & 1981:
David Gilmour – Mandolin
Nick Mason – Acoustic Guitar
Roger Waters – Clarinet, vocals
Richard Wright – Accordion

with:

Andy Bown – 12 String Acoustic Guitar
Peter Wood, Snowy White (1980) & Andy Roberts (1981) – Acoustic Guitar
Willie Wilson - Tambourine
Joe Chemay, Stan Farber, Jim Haas & Jon Joyce - Backing Vocals

Roger Waters - Live Version 2010-13

 Roger Waters - Trumpet
 G. E. Smith - Mandolin
 David Kilminster - Banjo
 Snowy White & Jon Carin - Acoustic Guitar
 Graham Broad - Ukulele
 Harry Waters - Accordion
 Robbie Wyckoff - Backing Vocals & Tambourine
 Jon Joyce, Kipp Lennon, Mark Lennon & Pat Lennon - Backing Vocals

with:
 David Gilmour – guest Mandolin at London O2 show, 12 May 2011.
 Nick Mason – guest Tambourine at London O2 show, 12 May 2011.

Further reading
Fitch, Vernon. The Pink Floyd Encyclopedia'' (2005). .

References

Pink Floyd songs
1979 songs
Rock ballads
Songs written by Roger Waters
Song recordings produced by Bob Ezrin
Song recordings produced by David Gilmour
Song recordings produced by Roger Waters
Songs about loneliness